Markt Erlbach is a municipality in the district of Neustadt (Aisch)-Bad Windsheim in Bavaria in Germany.

Mayor
Birgit Kreß was elected in 2008 as the new mayor.

References

Neustadt (Aisch)-Bad Windsheim